In mathematics, in particular in functional analysis and nonlinear analysis, it is possible to define the derivative of a function between two Fréchet spaces.  This notion of differentiation, as it is Gateaux derivative between Fréchet spaces, is significantly weaker than the derivative in a Banach space, even between general topological vector spaces.  Nevertheless, it is the weakest notion of differentiation for which many of the familiar theorems from calculus hold.  In particular, the chain rule is true.  With some additional constraints on the Fréchet spaces and functions involved, there is an analog of the inverse function theorem called the Nash–Moser inverse function theorem, having wide applications in nonlinear analysis and differential geometry.

Mathematical details 

Formally, the definition of differentiation is identical to the Gateaux derivative. Specifically, let  and  be Fréchet spaces,  be an open set, and  be a function.

if the limit exists.  One says that  is continuously differentiable, or  if the limit exists for all  and the mapping

is a continuous map.

Higher order derivatives are defined inductively via

Properties 

Let  and  be Fréchet spaces. Then the following properties hold:

 Fundamental theorem of calculus.
 The chain rule. For all  and   
 Linearity.  is linear in   More generally, if  is  then  is multilinear in the 's.
 Taylor's theorem with remainder.
 Commutativity of directional derivatives. If  is  then  for every permutation σ of 

The proofs of many of these properties rely fundamentally on the fact that it is possible to define the Riemann integral of continuous curves in a Fréchet space.

Smooth mappings 

Surprisingly, a mapping between open subset of Fréchet spaces is smooth (infinitely often differentiable) if it maps smooth curves to smooth curves; see Convenient analysis.
Moreover, smooth curves in spaces of smooth functions are just smooth functions of one variable more.

Consequences in differential geometry 

The existence of a chain rule allows for the definition of a manifold modeled on a Frèchet space: a Fréchet manifold.  Furthermore, the linearity of the derivative implies that there is an analog of the tangent bundle for Fréchet manifolds.

Tame Fréchet spaces 

Frequently the Fréchet spaces that arise in practical applications of the derivative enjoy an additional property: they are tame.  Roughly speaking, a tame Fréchet space is one which is almost a Banach space.  On tame spaces, it is possible to define a preferred class of mappings, known as tame maps.  On the category of tame spaces under tame maps, the underlying topology is strong enough to support a fully fledged theory of differential topology.  Within this context, many more techniques from calculus hold.  In particular, there are versions of the inverse and implicit function theorems.

See also

References 

 

Banach spaces
Differential calculus
Euclidean geometry
Functions and mappings
Generalizations of the derivative
Topological vector spaces